Kastytis Klimas (born 26 April 1969, in Domeikava) is track and field sprint athlete who competed internationally for Lithuania.

National championships 
3 gold medals in 100 m running: 1989, 1992, 1993
3 gold medals in 200 m running: 1988, 1991, 1992
1 gold medal in 4 × 100 m relay: 1991

Personal bests

Hand timing 
60 m - 6,4 (NR)
100 m - 9,9 (NR)
200 m - 20,8 (NR)
300 m - 33,9 (NR)

Electronic timing 
60 m - 6,62 (NR)
100 m - 10,33 (former NR)
200 m - 21,13
200 m - 21,27 (NR, indoors)

References 

1969 births
Living people
Lithuanian male sprinters